Hold On, I'm Coming is an album by drummer Art Blakey recorded in 1966 (with one track left over from the Gary Bartz debut recording session in 1965 for the album Soul Finger) and originally released on the Limelight label.

Reception

Allmusic awarded the album 3½ stars, stating: "Ultimately, this is a very enjoyable if not mindblowing soul-jazz date that offers a very relaxed and subtle view of Blakey."

Track listing 
 "Daydream" (John Sebastian) - 3:06
 "Hold On! I'm Comin'" (Isaac Hayes, David Porter) - 2:34
 "Secret Agent Man" (Steve Barri, P.F. Sloan) - 2:57
 "I Can't Grow Peaches on a Cherry Tree" (Camille Monte, Estelle Levitt) - 2:14
 "Walking My Cat Named Dog" (Norma Tanega) - 1:51
 "Sakeena"  (Art Blakey) - 3:43
 "Got My Mojo Working" (McKinley Morganfield) - 3:20
 "Mame"  (Jerry Herman) - 2:59
 "She Blew a Good Thing" (Henry Murray Jr., Ronnie Lewis) - 2:18
 "Monday, Monday" (John Phillips) - 2:20
 "Slowly But Surely" (John Hicks) - 7:07

Personnel 
Art Blakey - drums
 Chuck Mangione (tracks 1-10) Freddie Hubbard (track 11), Lee Morgan (track 11) - trumpet
Garnett Brown - trombone (tracks 1-10)
Melba Liston - trombone (tracks 1-10), arranger (tracks 1-3)
Tom McIntosh - trombone (tracks 1-10), arranger (tracks 4-10)
Frank Mitchell - tenor saxophone (tracks 1-10)
Gary Bartz (track 11) - alto saxophone
John Hicks - piano (track 11)
 Big John Patton (credited as Malcolm Bass) - organ (tracks 1-10)
Grant Green - guitar (tracks 1-10)
Reggie Johnson (tracks 1-10), Victor Sproles (track 11) - bass
Johnny Rodriguez - congas

References 

Art Blakey albums
1966 albums
Limelight Records albums